The 1917 Utah Agricultural Aggies football team was an American football team that represented Utah Agricultural College (later renamed Utah State University) in the Rocky Mountain Conference (RMC) during the 1917 college football season. In their second and final season under head coach Jack Watson, the Aggies compiled a 7–0–1 record (4–0 against RMC opponents), shut out four of eight opponents, and outscored all opponents by a total of 267 to 26. The team was regarded as the strongest squad fielded by the school to that time.

At the end of the season, both Denver and Utah State were undefeated against Rocky Mountain Conference opponents. A game between Denver and Utah State was proposed to determine an undisputed conference champion, but Denver's faculty ruled against the game. Denver officials claimed the title and asserted that the Utah Aggies "have a right to claim nothing more than a tie for the honors." Despite the controversy at the time, Utah State does not claim a conference championship for 1917 and lists the seasons as a second-place finish in its media guide.

Schedule

References

Utah Agricultural
Utah State Aggies football seasons
College football undefeated seasons
Utah Agricultural Aggies football